Bjørn Bergvall (born 13 February 1939) is a retired Norwegian sailor, born in Oslo. He won a gold medal in the Flying Dutchman class at the 1960 Olympics, together with Peder Lunde Jr. He placed fourth at the 1962 Flying Dutchman World Championship.

References

External links

1939 births
Living people
Norwegian male sailors (sport)
Olympic sailors of Norway
Sailors at the 1960 Summer Olympics – Flying Dutchman
Olympic gold medalists for Norway
Olympic medalists in sailing
Royal Norwegian Yacht Club sailors
Medalists at the 1960 Summer Olympics
Sportspeople from Oslo